Aino Lohikoski (1898–1981) was a Finnish actress.

Selected filmography
 Substitute Wife (1936)
 Tree Without Fruit (1947)
 Mother or Woman (1953)

References

Bibliography 
 Qvist, Per Olov & von Bagh, Peter. Guide to the Cinema of Sweden and Finland. Greenwood Publishing Group, 2000.

External links 
 

1898 births
1981 deaths
Actresses from Helsinki
People from Uusimaa Province (Grand Duchy of Finland)
Finnish stage actresses
Finnish film actresses
Finnish silent film actresses